Eufallia is a genus of beetles in the family Latridiidae, containing the following species:

 Eufallia africanus (Dajoz, 1970)
 Eufallia seminivea (Motschulsky, 1866)

References

Latridiidae genera